The Groupement des industries françaises aéronautiques et spatiales (abbreviated GIFAS) is the French Aerospace Industries Association created in 1908, featuring more than 260 members. The first name of the association was Association des Industries de la Locomotion Aérienne. It acquired its current name in 1975.

The current president of the GIFAS is Éric Trappier, Dassault Aviation CEO.

Organization
Some members are:
 Airbus
 Astrium
 Dassault Aviation
 GGB Bearing Technology
 Goodrich Corporation
 Groupe Latécoère
 MBDA
 Ratier
 Safran
 Snecma
 SOCATA
Socomore
 Thales Group
 Zodiac Aerospace
 SPI

See also
 Aerospace Industries Association

References

External links
 GIFAS home page

Aviation in France
Aviation trade associations
Organizations based in Paris
1908 establishments in France